Jaroslav Soukup (born 19 November 1946) is a Czech director. After graduating from Film and TV School of the Academy of Performing Arts in Prague he made his directorial debut in the 1976 film Boty plné vody.

Filmography 
 Konečná (1970 – student film)
 Temná brána noci (1971 – student film)
 Boty plné vody (1976 – povídka Zimní vítr)
 Drsná planina (1979)
 Romaneto (1980)
 Dostih (1981)
 Vítr v kapse (1982)
 Záchvěv strachu (1983)
 Láska z pasáže (1984)
 Pěsti ve tmě (1986)
 Discopříběh (1987)
 Kamarád do deště (1988)
 Divoká srdce (1989)
 Discopříběh 2 (1991)
 Kamarád do deště II – Příběh z Brooklynu
 Svatba upírů (1993)
 Byl jednou jeden polda (1995)
 Byl jednou jeden polda II. – major Maisner opět zasahuje! (1997)
 Byl jednou jeden polda III. – major Maixner a tančící drak (1999)
 Jak ukrást Dagmaru (2001)
 Policie Modrava (2008)- pilot episode of TV series
 Policie Modrava (2013/2014)- 15 episodes
 Policie Modrava (2016)- 8 episodes

References

External links 
 

1946 births
Czech film producers
Czech film directors
Czech screenwriters
Male screenwriters
Film people from Plzeň
Living people